Guram Yasonovich Tskhovrebov (14 July 1938 in Tskhinvali – 1998) was a Soviet football player.

Honours
 Soviet Top League winner: 1964.

International career
Tskhovrebov made his debut for USSR on 28 July 1967 in a 1968 Summer Olympics qualifier against Poland. He also played in UEFA Euro 1968 qualifiers, but was not selected for the final tournament squad.

External links
  Profile

1938 births
1998 deaths
Soviet footballers
Soviet Union international footballers
FC Dinamo Tbilisi players
FC Torpedo Kutaisi players
Soviet Top League players
Footballers from Georgia (country)
Ossetian people
People from Tskhinvali
Association football defenders